Düzköy is a village in the Fındıklı District, Rize Province, in Black Sea Region of Turkey. Its population is 42 (2021).

History 
The village, which was previously in the borders of Ardeşen District, become part of Fındıklı District in 2017. According to list of villages in Laz language book (2009), name of the village is Ghetsi. Most villagers are ethnically Laz.

References

Villages in Fındıklı District
Laz settlements in Turkey